Boyce Historic District is a national historic district located at Boyce, Clarke County, Virginia. It encompasses 154 contributing buildings in the town of Boyce. They include a variety of residential, commercial, and institutional buildings dating from 1880 to the 1920s.  Notable buildings include the Boyce Colored School (1885), Mount Zion Baptist Church (1910), Simpson's Store and later Boyce Grocery, former Boyce Bank now used as the Town Hall (1908), Boyce railroad station (1913), Boyce United Methodist Church (1916), and Emmanuel Chapel Episcopal Church (1916).

It was listed on the National Register of Historic Places in 2004.

References

External links
 

Historic districts in Clarke County, Virginia
National Register of Historic Places in Clarke County, Virginia
Historic districts on the National Register of Historic Places in Virginia